Etlingera dictyota is a monocotyledonous plant species described by Axel Dalberg Poulsen and Anthony L. Lamb. Etlingera dictyota is part of the genus Etlingera and the family Zingiberaceae. No subspecies are listed in the Catalog of Life.

References 

dictyota